Suleiman Hartzenberg (born 20 May 2003) is a South African rugby union player for the  in the United Rugby Championship. His regular position is centre or wing.

Hartzenberg was named in the Stormers side for the 2022–23 United Rugby Championship, making his debut in Round 1 against . Described as a member of a "very special generation" at the Stormers by coach John Dobson, he was named in the South Africa A squad for their European tour in October 2022.

References

External links
Itsrugby.co.uk profile

South African rugby union players
Living people
Rugby union centres
Rugby union wings
Stormers players
2003 births
Rugby union players from Cape Town
Western Province (rugby union) players